The Sun Ra discography is one of the largest discographies in music history. Jazz keyboardist, bandleader and composer Sun Ra recorded dozens of singles and over one hundred full-length albums, comprising well over 1,000 songs, and making him one of the most prolific recording artists of the 20th century.

History

His own El Saturn Records albums were usually printed in editions of 75 copies per album, and were sold primarily at live performances. Many of Sun Ra's early albums were recorded at home by Ra himself on wire or early tape recorders, and are decidedly lo-fi. Despite the technological limitations, Ra used some innovative recording techniques, and these recordings provided an unprecedented level of documentation, and were inspirational in showing how artists could take control of the means of production and distribution of their works.

Prior to the 1970s, most of these albums were produced in Chicago through the "El Saturn Records Research" enterprise established by Ra and his colleague Alton Abraham, while later El Saturn Records were produced in Philadelphia. A batch of the most significant recordings were licensed to Impulse! Records in the mid-1970s. They were not as successful as hoped, and were deleted from the Impulse catalog, becoming available around the world as inexpensive "cut-outs" and making the music more widely available.

Most El Saturn Records were hand-decorated by Arkestra members, and these LP records sometimes sell for high prices among collectors. These El Saturn Records releases, dating from the 1950s to at least the late 1980s, typically had little or no information as to performers or recording dates, and sometimes didn't even list the songs on the album, often pressing one LP side from one era with another from a different decade, leading to some confusion among completists and fans.

After Sun Ra's death, many of his recordings were released on compact disc for the first time by Evidence Records, Ihnfinity Music, ESP Disk / ZYX Music, or Impulse!. As is the case with an artist whose output is so extensive, there is quite a bit of debate regarding his "best" albums. Of all these recordings, many critics and enthusiasts feel that the 1959 big band album Jazz In Silhouette is the best entry-point into his work, with The Penguin Guide to Jazz naming the album as part of a recommended "Core Collection" for any serious jazz fan and as "one of the most important jazz records since World War II."

Albums

Studio Albums

Archival Releases

Posthumous releases of studio material and rehearsals

Live albums

Posthumous compilations

Related

References

External links
 
 
 

Jazz discographies
Discographies of American artists
Discography